Karim Ishan or Karimishan may refer to:
 Karim Ishan, Maraveh Tappeh
 Karim Ishan, Torkaman